Kristin Krone (born June 17, 1968) is an American former alpine skier who competed in the 1988 Winter Olympics and 1992 Winter Olympics.

External links
 sports-reference.com

1968 births
Living people
American female alpine skiers
Olympic alpine skiers of the United States
Alpine skiers at the 1988 Winter Olympics
Alpine skiers at the 1992 Winter Olympics
Place of birth missing (living people)
20th-century American women
People from Olympic Valley, California